The Paulinskill Valley Trail is a rail trail along the Paulins Kill river in New Jersey. It was originally a right-of-way of the New York, Susquehanna and Western Railroad and the Blairstown Railway.

Description
Vestiges of the railroad remain including several bridges, stations, mileage markers, telegraph poles and other railway artifacts. There are also numerous benches and signs explaining the history of the trail and its artifacts.  Over 200 species of birds have been sighted on the trail as well as a multitude of other wildlife.

The Paulinskill Valley Trail intersects the Sussex Branch Trail at Warbasse Junction just north of Newton as well as the 3.5-mile Great Valley Rail Trail, along Paulins Kill Lake.

The trail is frequented by hikers, bicyclists, joggers and people who are just out for a stroll. Horseback riding is also permitted. Access is denied to motor vehicles, however, although trailheads typically provide some modest amount of parking. Although the trail is generally well-maintained from the Paulinskill Viaduct north, south of that location the quality of the trail is somewhat uneven. Over the years there have been surprisingly few encroachments onto the right-of-way. The most notable encroachment is at Blairstown Airport where the trail ceases to exist for about a half-mile (1 km). Signage directs the hiker to where the trail continues.

History 
In 1886, the New York, Susquehanna and Western Railroad built the first part of the railway tracks that is now the trail. In 1962 the railroad ceased its operations on this line, and the tracks were removed. In 1985 the New Jersey Department of Environmental Protection organized a meeting in Blairstown to decide what should be done with the intention of buying the land. A year later, in 1986, the NJDEP bought the land.

References

External links 
 Paulinskill Valley Trail Committee
 Trail history & Breakdown of each section
 Photo Gallery

 

Rail trails in New Jersey
Protected areas of Sussex County, New Jersey
Protected areas of Warren County, New Jersey
Bike paths in New Jersey